Grauman's Egyptian Theatre is a historic movie theater located at 6706 Hollywood Blvd. in Hollywood, California. Opened in 1922, it is an early example of a lavish movie palace and is noted as having been the site of the first-ever Hollywood film premiere. From 1998 until 2020, it was owned and operated by the American Cinematheque, a member-based cultural organization.

In May 2020, Netflix became the owner of the theater. Following the sale, the American Cinematheque will continue to host events on weekends.

History 

The Egyptian was built by showman Sid Grauman and real estate developer Charles E. Toberman, who subsequently built the nearby El Capitan Theatre and Chinese Theatre on Hollywood Boulevard. Grauman had previously opened one of the United States' first movie palaces, the Million Dollar Theater, on Broadway in Downtown Los Angeles in 1918. The Egyptian cost $800,000 to build and took 18 months to construct. Architects Meyer & Holler designed the building, and it was built by The Milwaukee Building Company.

The Egyptian was the location for the first-ever Hollywood premiere, Robin Hood, starring Douglas Fairbanks, on Wednesday, October 18, 1922. As the film reportedly cost over $1 million to produce, the admission price to the premiere was $5. One could reserve a seat up to two weeks in advance for the daily performances. Evening admission was 75¢, $1 or $1.50. The film was not shown in any other Los Angeles theater during that year. The theater also premiered Cecil B. DeMille's 1923 film The Ten Commandments.

In 1927, Grauman opened a second movie theater further west on Hollywood Boulevard. In keeping with the public fascination in that era with international themes, he named his new theater the Chinese Theatre. Its popularity eventually rivaled and surpassed the Egyptian because of its numerous celebrity handprints, footprints, and signatures in the cement of its forecourt.

American Cinematheque

The Egyptian was closed in 1992 and fell into disrepair. In 1996, the Community Redevelopment Agency of Los Angeles sold the theater to the American Cinematheque for a nominal $1 with the provision that the landmark building be restored to its original grandeur and reopened as a movie theater.

The Cinematheque committed to raising the funds to pay for the restoration and to using the renovated theater as home for its programs of public film exhibition. The Egyptian was reopened to the public on December 4, 1998, after a $12.8 million renovation. The original theater seated 1,760 patrons in a single auditorium. In the restored Egyptian, the building has been reconfigured to add a second screening theater. The main theater now accommodates 616 patrons and is named after Los Angeles philanthropist Lloyd E. Rigler. The 78 seat screening theater is named for Steven Spielberg. While the interior was rebuilt as two modern cinemas, using some of the decorative elements of the original theater, the exterior was completely restored to its original 1922 appearance.

In April 2019, it was announced that Netflix was seeking to purchase the theater from the American Cinematheque to use as a special events venue, possibly to qualify its films and series to be considered for Oscar and Emmy award nomination, respectively, and that the American Cinematheque would still hold events on weekends. Immediately after the announcement, a petition campaign called on the American Cinematheque board, the California Attorney General, and the Los Angeles City Council to halt the sale and hold a public meeting to answer questions about the proposed sale and status of the Attorney General's investigation. On May 29, 2020, it was announced that Netflix would acquire the theater and invest in some renovations.

The American Cinematheque also rents and presents film screenings at the Aero Theatre in Santa Monica and at the Los Feliz 3 theater in the Los Feliz district of Los Angeles.

Inspiration for other movie theaters

The layout, design, and name of the Egyptian Theatre was emulated by other movie palaces in the USA. Peery's Egyptian Theatre in Ogden, Utah, opened in 1924, is one example.

Architecture 
The exterior of the theater is in the Egyptian Revival style. However, the roof pans above the main entrance are items not in the ancient Egyptian style. The original plans for the theater show a Hispanic-themed theater, but at some point these plans were changed to an Egyptian style.

It is probable that this was due to public fascination with the multiple expeditions searching for the tomb of Tutankhamun by archaeologist Howard Carter over the preceding years. (Carter eventually discovered the tomb on November 4, 1922—just two weeks after the Egyptian opened.) At that time, the change in architectural style was determined, the Hispanic-styled roof pans had already been delivered and paid for; they were kept and used in the building.

Following the destruction from the 1994 Northridge earthquake, architecture and design studio Hodgetts + Fung was brought on to design a new cinema and update the technology to accommodate the American Cinematheque's programming of film and new media in 1997. The exterior was restored to its original appearance a year later while projection, sound, seating, mechanical systems, and circulation were brought up to 21st century standards. In 2000, the project won the National Preservation Award from the National Trust for Historic Preservation.

The exterior and interior walls contain Egyptian-style paintings and hieroglyphs.

Capitalizing on Southern California's sunny weather is the large courtyard in the front, complete with a fountain . This is actually the "entrance hall" (the theater doors used to open directly into the auditorium) and was specifically designed to host the theater's famous red-carpet ceremonies.

Appearances in popular culture
The theater was featured in Visiting... with Huell Howser Episode 712.

The theater is the scene of a gunfight during the conclusion of a case in the detective video game L.A. Noire.

The theater features in Jonathan Franzen's 2021 novel, Crossroads.

See also
Los Angeles Historic-Cultural Monuments in Hollywood
Grauman's Chinese Theatre
Egyptian Theatre (disambiguation)

References

External links

Friends of the American Cinematheque at the Egyptian Theatre petition campaign

Movie palaces
Cinemas and movie theaters in Hollywood, Los Angeles
Los Angeles Historic-Cultural Monuments
Egyptian-style theaters
Egyptian Revival architecture in the United States
Hollywood Boulevard
1922 establishments in California
Theatres completed in 1922
Netflix